Desoto Acres is a census-designated place (CDP) in northwestern Sarasota County, Florida, United States.

Desoto Acres was first listed as a CDP prior to the 2020 census.

Demographics

References 

Census-designated places in Sarasota County, Florida
Census-designated places in Florida